Phil Mills (born 30 August 1963) is a Welsh rally racing co-driver. He was winner of the 2003 World Rally Championship (WRC), as co-driver to Petter Solberg.

Mills was born in Trefeglwys, Powys.  He has a place in the Welsh Sports Hall of Fame, as the first Welshman to win the Wales Rally. His first rally was in 1983, and his WRC debut in 1994. He joined Solberg in Ford in 1999, later moving with him to the Subaru World Rally Team.

Mills lives with his partner Helen and their children in Powys.

On 11 June 2010, Mills announced his immediate retirement from co-driving to concentrate on his motorsport preparation business.

The 1–2 November, Mills returned to the WRC with Petter Solberg in the 2014 Rallye du Condroz with a Citroën C4 WRC. Mills later served as a co-driver for Elfyn Evans in the 2018 Tour de Corse, filling in for Daniel Barritt who suffered a concussion during the 2018 Rally Mexico. Mills also lent his voice as a co-driver in the 2019 racing video game Dirt Rally 2.0, and reunited with Solberg in the latter's final career rally, 2019 Wales Rally GB with a Volkswagen Polo GTI R5.

Results
1984 class win in Wales Road Rally Championship
1992 and 1993 Welsh National Champion
1993 Team Co-ordinator for Ford at Rally GB
1996 2nd in British Championship with Mark Higgins, coordinated for M-Sport and Co-drives for Armin Schwarz in Corsica
1997 Wins British Rally Championship
1998 6th overall in WRC
1999 joins Petter Solberg at Ford, 18th in WRC
2000 both join Subaru – 10th in WRC
2001 10th in WRC
2002 2nd in WRC, 1 win (Wales)
2003 World Rally Champion, 4 wins (Cyprus, Australia, Corsica, Wales)
2004 2nd in WRC, 5 wins (New Zealand, Acropolis, Japan, Wales, Sardinia)
2005 2nd in WRC, 3 wins (Sweden, Mexico, Wales)
2006 6th in WRC
2007 5th in WRC
2008 6th in WRC
2009 5th in WRC

Between 1988 and 1990 he co-drove in 88 rallies.

References

External links
 Subaru World Rally Team
 Phil Mills profile Phil Mills profile on wrc.com
 Phil Mills eWRC stats page 
 Phil's blog on ScoobyNet Phil Mills blog on ScoobyNet

1963 births
Living people
Sportspeople from Powys
Welsh rally drivers
British rally co-drivers